Christian Guiffroy (born 21 January 1941) is a French gymnast. He competed at the 1964 Summer Olympics, the 1968 Summer Olympics and the 1972 Summer Olympics.

References

1941 births
Living people
French male artistic gymnasts
Olympic gymnasts of France
Gymnasts at the 1964 Summer Olympics
Gymnasts at the 1968 Summer Olympics
Gymnasts at the 1972 Summer Olympics
Sportspeople from Toulouse
20th-century French people